First Lady of Tijuana is the honorary title of the spouse of the municipal president of Tijuana. This title is not official, but its use is more common and widespread in the media. Spouses of municipal presidents officially bear the title of President of the Municipal DIF Sponsorship. The current first lady is Alicia Llanos de Ramos.

First ladies of Tijuana
Tijuana